A Thousand Different Ways is the third studio album by Clay Aiken. The album, which was executive produced by  Jaymes Foster, consists of ten covers and four new songs. It was released by RCA on September 19, 2006. The first single was "Without You" and the second, "A Thousand Days."

Writers of the four new songs ("These Open Arms", "Lonely No More", "A Thousand Days" and "Everything I Have") include Jon Bon Jovi, Desmond Child, Andreas Carlsson, Jeremy Bose, Aldo Nova, Samuel Waermo, Mimmi Waermo, and Aiken himself. "These Open Arms" previously appeared as a bonus track on the Japanese issue Bon Jovi's 2005 album "Have A Nice Day".

Available only through iTunes as a bonus cut when the complete album is downloaded, is a fifth new song titled "Lover All Alone". Aiken wrote the lyrics and David Foster wrote the music.

"Broken Wings" is the last cut on the album and an original poem written by Erin Taylor was woven throughout the lyrics. The last line of this poem which is also the last line added to the song lyrics became the album title.

Kmart offered for a limited time (as a download) an exclusive bonus recording of If You Don't Know Me by Now.

Sales and chart performance
The album, selling 211,000 units in its first week, made its debut on the Billboard charts at number two on the Billboard 200, number three on Digital Albums and number one on Internet Sales.

The album received RIAA Gold certification on November 2, 2006 and spent 14 weeks on the Billboard 200 chart.

Track listing
"Right Here Waiting"
"Lonely No More"
"Without You"
"Everytime You Go Away"
"Sorry Seems to Be the Hardest Word"
"When I See You Smile"
"A Thousand Days"
"(Everything I Do) I Do It for You"
"Because You Loved Me"
"I Want to Know What Love Is"
"These Open Arms"
"Here You Come Again"
"Everything I Have"
"Broken Wings"

Bonus tracks
<li>"Lover All Alone" (iTunes Exclusive; album-only download)
"If You Don't Know Me By Now" (Kmart Exclusive; limited time download)

Song notes

"Right Here Waiting" Written by: Richard Marx / Produced by: John Fields – 4:20
"When I See You Smile" Written by: Diane Warren / Produced by: John Fields – 4:24
"Without You" Written by: Thomas Evans, Peter Ham / Produced by: John Fields – 3:36
"Lonely No More" Written by: Andreas Carlsson, Samuel Waermo, Mimmi Waermo & Clay Aiken / Produced by: Andreas Carlsson & Samuel Waermo – 3:27
"Sorry Seems to be the Hardest Word" Written by: Elton John & Bernie Taupin / Produced by: Per Magnusson & David Kreuger – 3:43
 "Everytime You Go Away" Written by: Daryl Hall / Produced by: Adam Anders – 4:08
 "Everything I Do (I Do It For You)" Written by: Bryan Adams, Michael Kamen & Robert John "Mutt" Lange / Produced by: John Fields – 4:00
 "I Want to Know What Love Is" (guest vocal by Suzie McNeil)  Written by: Michael Jones / Produced by: Russ Irwin, Marti Frederiksen & Charlton Pettus – 3:41
 "These Open Arms" Written by: Jon Bon Jovi & Desmond Child / Produced by: John Fields – 3:27
 "Because You Loved Me" Written by: Diane Warren / Produced by: Eman – 4:43
 "Here You Come Again" Written by: Barry Mann & Cynthia Weil / Produced by: Adam Anders – 3:32
 "Everything I Have" (featuring William Joseph on piano) Written by: Jeremy Bose / Produced by: Humberto Gatica – 4:07
 "A Thousand Days" Written by: Christian Leuzzi, Aldo Nova & Emanuel Olsson / Produced by: John Fields – 4:28
 "Broken Wings" Written by: Richard Page, John Lang & Steve George / Produced by: Eman – 3:58
 "Lover All Alone" Written by: Clay Aiken & David Foster, Emanuel Kiriakou / Produced by: Emanuel Kiriakou – 4:57
 "If You Don't Know Me By Now" Written by: Kenny Gamble & Leon Huff – 3:56

On his 2005 Juke Box Tour, Aiken previewed 3 other songs that did not make the final album cut.  "Back For More" was sung at every concert date after its introduction at GMA's Summer Concert Series in 2005. "Tears Run Dry" and "Just You" each got one third of the JBT performance dates.

Personnel
 Stephen Lu – String arranger and conductor, Piano
 Dorian Crozier – drums
 Tommy Barbarella – Keyboard
 Owsley & Greg Suran – Guitar
 Ken Chastain – Percussion
 Suzie Katsyama – String contractor
 Charlie Bisharat – Violin
 Michele Richards – Violin
 Matt Funes – Viola
 Larry Corbett – Cello
 Jonas Groning – String arranger
 Henrik Nordenback – Drums, Percussion
 Sebastian Nyhlund – Electric Guitar, Acoustic Guitar
 Esbjorn Ohrwall – Electric Guitar
 Thomas Blindberg – Bass
 Fredrik Larsson – Piano
 Emil Heiling – Background vocals
 Michael Bland – Drums
 Jason Scheff – Background Vocals
 Nikki Hassman – Vocal Production, Background Vocals
 Rasmus 'Raz' Billie Bahncke – Keyboard & Drum Programming, String arranger
 Rene Tromborg – Drum Programming
 Cliff Lin – Drum Programming, Guitars, Assistant Engineer, Editing
 Rebecca Walker – Background Vocals
 Jeff Bova – String arranger
 Jules Chaiken – String conductor
 Emanuel Kiriakou – Piano, Acoustic & Electric Guitars, Bass, Keyboards, Programming
 Jimi Englund – Drums, Percussion
 Doug Petty – Hammond B-3
 Tom Leonard – Background Vocals
 Russ Irwin – Guitars, Keyboards, Programming
 Charlton Pettus – Guitars, Bass, Programming
 Ryan Brown – Drums
 Quiana Parler – Background Vocals
 Adam Anders – Keyboards, Guitars, Bass
 Shawn Pelton – Drums
 David Foster – String arranger
 Jeremy Lubbock – String arranger
 Dean Parks – Guitar
 Erin Taylor – Additional lyrics, spoken word
 Morgan Grace – Harmony, Background Vocals

Orchestra
 Jay Lifton – String orchestration
 Concertmaster – Marshall Coid, Principal: Dorothy Lawson, Leader: Ralph Farris
 Violins: Jonathan Dinklage, Cornelius Dufallo, Amy Kauffman, Brian Krinke, Carol Pool, Rob Shaw, Yuri Vodovoz, Marshall Coid
 Violas: Juna Chung, David Gold, Lara Lynne Hicks, Ralph Farris
 Cellos: Mairi Dorman-Phaneuf, Erik Friedlander, Dorothy Lawson

Singles
2006 "Without You"
2007 "A Thousand Days"

Certifications

Footnotes

Clay Aiken albums
2006 albums
RCA Records albums
19 Recordings albums